John Arthur Callesen (born 24 May 1950) is a former New Zealand rugby union player who played four test matches for the All Blacks in 1974 and 1975.

References

1950 births
Living people
Rugby union players from Palmerston North
People educated at Nelson College
New Zealand rugby union players
New Zealand international rugby union players
Manawatu rugby union players
Rugby union locks